Anicius Auchenius Bassus may refer to:

 Anicius Auchenius Bassus (prefect) (fl. 382–384), Roman politician
 Anicius Auchenius Bassus (consul 408), Roman politician and son of the prefect
 Anicius Auchenius Bassus (consul 431), Roman high official and son of the 408 consul